Siegfried Mair (18 April 1939 – 15 May 1977) was an Italian luger who competed from the early 1960s to the early 1970s. He was born in Toblach. He won the bronze medal in the men's doubles event at the 1964 Winter Olympics in Innsbruck.

Mair also won a bronze medal in the men's doubles event at the 1967 FIL World Luge Championships in Hammarstrand, Sweden.

He was killed in a car accident in 1977.

References

Olympic Review information on Mair's death in a car crash in 1977.

External links
 

1939 births
1977 deaths
Italian male lugers
Lugers at the 1964 Winter Olympics
Lugers at the 1968 Winter Olympics
Lugers at the 1972 Winter Olympics
Road incident deaths in Italy
1977 road incidents
Olympic lugers of Italy
Place of death missing
Olympic medalists in luge
Medalists at the 1964 Winter Olympics
Olympic bronze medalists for Italy
People from Toblach
Sportspeople from Südtirol